Alfred Nourney, also known as Baron Alfred von Drachstedt (February 26, 1892 — November 15, 1972), was a Dutch-born German gentleman who survived the sinking of the RMS Titanic in 1912. Nourney was 20 when he travelled as a first-class passenger on board .

Titanic
Travelling under the false name and title of Baron Alfred von Drachstedt, Nourney boarded the Titanic in Cherbourg, France, as a second-class passenger. His request to a purser to be transferred to a first-class cabin was granted, largely because of his supposedly aristocratic status. He had purchased expensive items, including clothes, jewellery, walking sticks, two sets of toilet articles and a fountain pen, in order to support his pretence.

On the night of April 14, 1912, he was playing bridge  with other men in the first-class smoking room. When Nourney first sensed a disturbance, he briefly left to investigate, but returned to continue playing. Minutes later, they became aware of the situation and boarded Lifeboat #7 without difficulties, lowering away at 12:45am. While the others were rowing, he sat motionless, smoking cigarettes. He also carried a pistol which he used to fire gunshots into the air through the night.

While on board the Carpathia, he rested on a pile of blankets which were to be distributed among the survivors. A woman who entered the room pulled the uppermost blanket, making Nourney roll onto the floor. As everyone applauded the woman, he disappeared.

Upon disembarking on April 18 in New York City, he said he had lost all his money on the Titanic and wished to quickly return to Europe. He returned to France and then to Cologne, Germany, where his mother lived.

Later life
During the 1920s, he was a salesman for Daimler-Benz AG, and he competed in motorsports.   He settled in Bad Honnef, Germany, where he became an honour member of the "Rot-Weiss" Tennis Club.  He married and had two daughters.

Death
Nourney died on November 15, 1972, and was the last remaining adult male from Titanic's first class who survived.

References

1892 births
1972 deaths
People from Cologne
RMS Titanic survivors
Dutch emigrants to Germany